Kushtia Sadar is an Upazila of Kushtia District in the Division of Khulna, Bangladesh.

Demographics

According to the 2011 Bangladesh census, Kushtia Sadar Upazila had 120,087 households and a population of 502,255, 21.6% of whom lived in urban areas. 8.6% of the population was under the age of 5. The literacy rate (age 7 and over) was 53.9%, compared to the national average of 51.8%.

Arts and culture
International artists have come together at Smaran Matshya Beej Khamar to participate in the annual CRACK International Art Camp since 2007.

7th National Debate Federation program (NDF) was held in Kushtia Medical College in 2019.

Administration
Kushtia Sadar Upazila is divided into Kushtia Municipality and 14 union parishads: Abdulpur, Ailchara, Alampur, Barakhada, Battail, Gosind Durgapur, Harinarayanpur, Hatas Haripur, Jiarakhi, Jhaudia, Mazampur, Monohardia, Paitkabari, and Ujangram. The union parishads are subdivided into 122 mauzas and 176 villages.

Kushtia Municipality is subdivided into 21 wards and 36 mahallas.

Education
Islamic University, Kushtia
Kushtia Medical College
 Kushtia Zilla School
 Kuatul Islam Kamil Madrasah
 Kushtia Government Technical School and College
 Technical Training Center, Kushtia
 Goswami Durgapur High School
 Kaburhat High School
 Kushtia Govt. Collage
 Kushtia Islamia Collage
 Ail Chara Secondary School
 Khorda ail Chara High School
 Khejurtola Patikabari High School
 Kushtia Govt. Central College
 Chand Sultana Secondary Girls' School

Media
Numerous Bengali daily and weekly newspapers are published from Kushtia. There's also a Bengali TV channel broadcast in the region.
 KUSHTIATOWN.COM
 DOINIK24
 Amader Zone 24

See also
Upazilas of Bangladesh
Districts of Bangladesh
Divisions of Bangladesh
 Islamic University, Kushtia

References

Upazilas of Kushtia District
Kushtia District
Khulna Division